Charlotte Sterry defeated Agnes Morton 6–3, 6–3 in the All Comers' Final, but the reigning champion Dorothea Douglass defeated Sterry 6–0, 6–3 in the challenge round to win the ladies' singles tennis title at the 1904 Wimbledon Championships.

Draw

Challenge round

All comers' finals

Top half

Section 1

Section 2

Bottom half

Section 3

Section 4

References

External links

Women's Singles
Wimbledon Championship by year – Women's singles
Wimbledon Championships - Singles
Wimbledon Championships - Singles